The Journey 1978–2009 is a compilation album by British singer-songwriter Chris Rea, released in 2011 by Music Club Deluxe. It features songs spanning his entire career, from 1978's Whatever Happened to Benny Santini? to 2009's Still So Far to Go: The Best of Chris Rea. It had a modest chart performance, peaking at number 66 on the UK Albums Chart, but was certified Gold by BPI in 2013.

Track listing 
All tracks written by Chris Rea.

Disc one 

 "Let's Dance" – 4:06
 "On the Beach" – 6:51
 "Driving Home for Christmas" – 4:01
 "I Can Hear Your Heartbeat" – 3:26
 "Julia" – 3:54
 "Stainsby Girls" – 3:52
 "Come So Far, Yet Still So Far to Go" – 4:13
 "God's Great Banana Skin" – 5:18
 "Josephine (French Edit)" – 3:56
 "Texas" – 4:00
 "Working on It" – 4:24
 "Heaven" – 4:12
 "Candles" – 4:44
 "Shamrock Diaries" – 4:13
 "Blue Street" – 7:08
 "Ace of Hearts" – 4:53
 "You Can Go Your Own Way" – 3:54

Disc two 

 "The Road to Hell (Part 2)" – 4:35
 "Auberge" – 4:45
 "Fool (If You Think It's Over)" – 4:04
 "Soft Top, Hard Shoulder" – 4:23
 "Looking for the Summer" – 5:02
 "Tell Me There's a Heaven" – 6:01
 "Diamonds" – 4:52
 "Loving You" – 3:48
 "I Don't Know What It Is But I Love It" – 3:35
 "On the Beach (Summer '88)" – 3:42
 "Windy Town" – 4:26
 "Giverny" – 5:40
 "The Blue Café" – 4:46
 "Winter Song" – 4:31
 "Easy Rider" – 4:49
 "Two Roads" – 3:43
 "Saudade Parts 1 & 2 (Tribute to Ayrton Senna)" – 6:48

Charts

Weekly charts

Year-end charts

Certifications

References 

2011 compilation albums
Chris Rea compilation albums